is a historically Japanese fraternity which was established at the University of Southern California in 1920.

History

The Early Years
Gakusei Kai was formed by USC students Takeo Momita, Yukiro Miyata, Gongoro Nakamura, and Kiichi Iwanaga in 1920 in order to provide affordable housing to the small Japanese-American student population at the university. With the help of Los Angeles community leaders, this group of men campaigned across Southern California to raise funds for a home next to the USC campus. With the money that was raised, the organization purchased a three-story home located on West 35th Street in Los Angeles, where USC's Heritage Hall is located today. The home was registered under the name "Gakusei Kai" and as the number of Japanese-American students began to climb, so did the demand for membership.

As a result of the increasing popularity, a second home on an adjoining lot was purchased by the organization. This new addition created 13 more accommodations, totaling the number of available spots to 32. However, the university bought out several lots in the 1930s to expand the campus, including both Gakusei Kai lots. As compensation for the loss of their facilities, the university offered the students another home located on 727 West 30th street in Los Angeles. Prior to the occupancy of Gakusei Kai, this house was in use by USC professors and also briefly used as housing for officials in the 1932 Olympics.

Impact of World War II
As the United States' involvement in World War II grew, persons of Japanese ancestry were removed from their homes and relocated to internment camps across the country. Consequently, the Gakusei Kai house was abandoned and reclaimed by the university. During the students' absence, the structure was leased to another fraternity. Upon the return of the Japanese students in 1946, USC gave the house back to the group and Gakusei Kai was reestablished.

Membership standards change
In the 1980s, Gakusei Kai accepted its first female members into the traditionally all male fraternity. While the organization's alumni predicted that the acceptance of females into Gakusei Kai would never happen, members today acknowledge that the inclusion of women adds an important dynamic to the group.

Gakusei Kai today
Today, Gakusei Kai houses about 15 students in its 10 bedroom facility. All members are privy to their own parking spot, cable, wireless internet, use of laundry facilities, and use of kitchen facilities. Meetings are held regularly on the 1st Sunday of every month and attendance to a house outing is required once a semester. The ratio of men to women is now approximately 1:1.

Membership criteria
Gakusei Kai prides itself on the following five membership standards and looks for the same in potential new members:
 Academic achievement
 Character development
 Leadership ability
 Financial responsibility
 Personal development

While the organization was traditionally Japanese, students of all ethnicities are welcome to apply for membership.

Government

Notable alumni
 David Takemura - Emmy-winning Visual Effects Supervisor for Star Trek
 Gongoro Nakamura - First naturalized Issei President of Downtown Los Angeles Japanese American Citizens League
 Milton Lie - VP Technology of Netrake

External links
 Official website

Student activities at the University of Southern California
Asian-American organizations
Japanese-American history
Student organizations established in 1920
1920 establishments in California